Ghuman khurd is a village in Gurdaspur in the Majha region of the state of Punjab in India.

References

Villages in Gurdaspur district